Vivere may refer to:

 Vivere Entertainment SA, a company which operates Virgin Megastores in Greece
 The Best of Andrea Bocelli: Vivere, an album by Andrea Bocelli
 Vivere (TV series), an Italian television series
 "Vivere" (song), a song written by Cesare Andrea Bixio
 Vivere! (1936 film), an Italian film directed by Guido Brignone
 Vivere (2019 film), an Italian film directed by Francesca Archibugi
 Viverse, a metaverse platform created by HTC VIVE